Fighting Squadron 42 or VF-42 was an aviation unit of the United States Navy. Originally established as Scouting Squadron 1B (VS-1B) in May 1928, it was redesignated as VS-1S in 1930, redesignated as VS-1B in 1931, redesignated as VS-41 on 1 July 1937, redesignated as VF-42 on 15 March 1941 and disestablished on 22 June 1942. It was the first US Navy squadron to be designated as VF-42.

Operational history

VF-42 shot down 25 Japanese aircraft until the squadron was disestablished following the sinking of the Yorktown on 7 June 1942 during the Battle of Midway.

See also
 History of the United States Navy
 List of inactive United States Navy aircraft squadrons
 List of United States Navy aircraft squadrons

References

Strike fighter squadrons of the United States Navy